Cancillopsis is a genus of sea snails, marine gastropod mollusks, in the family Mitridae, the miters or miter snails.

Species
Species within the genus Cancillopsis include:
 † Cancillopsis acuminata (Shuto, 1969)
 Cancillopsis chuoi (S.-I Huang & R. Salisbury, 2017)
 Cancillopsis liliformis (S.-I Huang & R. Salisbury, 2017)
 Cancillopsis meimiaoae (Huang & Salisbury, 2017)

References

External links
 Fedosov A., Puillandre N., Herrmann M., Kantor Yu., Oliverio M., Dgebuadze P., Modica M.V. & Bouchet P. (2018). The collapse of Mitra: molecular systematics and morphology of the Mitridae (Gastropoda: Neogastropoda). Zoological Journal of the Linnean Society. 183(2): 253-337

 
Gastropods described in 2018